Davis George Mwamfupe (born September 27, 1956) is Mayor of Dodoma, the Capital City of The United Republic of Tanzania. He is a member of the CCM, and a professor at the Dodoma University. He also served at the University of Dar es Salaam from 2005 to 2008.

Mwamfupe was appointed a Councillor on 23 June 2017.  On 20 July 2017 he was officially elected as the mayor of Dodoma Municipal Council.

Academic Leadership

Selected publications 

 "The Role and Challenges of Social Networks as Survival Strategies in Agro-Pastoral Communities in Central Tanzania" Journal of Humanities (JH), Volume 3(1)2016, 52-62
 Briggs, John and Davis Mwamfupe (2000). “Peri-Urban Development in an Era of Structural Adjustment in Africa: The City of Dar es Salaam,” Urban Studies, 37(4): 797-809
 "Changing village land, labour and livelihoods :Rungwe and Kyela Districts, Tanzania" Afrika-Studiecentrum, 1998

Memberships

References 

 

1956 births
University of Dar es Salaam
University of Dodoma
Living people
Mayors of Dodoma